Robert Beatty (born 1981) is an American artist and musician based in Lexington, Kentucky, best known for his noise band Hair Police, his solo project Three Legged Race, and most recently for his work designing album covers, including Tame Impala's Currents (2015), Kesha's Rainbow (2017), and limited-edition artwork for The Weeknd's Dawn FM (2022).

Early life
Robert Beatty was born in 1981 on a cattle and tobacco farm in rural Kentucky near Nicholasville—"one of the most beautiful places in the world", according to Beatty. Growing up, he "constantly" drew, teaching himself and taking inspiration from MTV's series Liquid Television, Terry Gilliam's animated work, and Mad. He began to experiment with his family camcorder, exploring circuit bending and video feedback, and during high school later started investigating and playing music with a friend (Beatty was fond of music from Warp Records) and designing concert posters.

Beatty never attended art school (or college at all), instead moving to Lexington after high school. He also worked for a time at radio station WRFL, and supported himself for years working at a gas station and as a janitor.

Artwork
Beatty's graphic design work employs a distinctive style which has been called "trippy", "nostalgic", "psychedelic", "dark", and "mystifying;" Beatty tries to evoke a "weird sense of wonder." He began working by hand and today mostly uses Adobe Illustrator and an old version of Photoshop running on a ten-year-old computer to perform his "digital airbrushing", replicating and subverting traditional graphic design techniques using software. However, Beatty says that his work often "goes back to drawing, because that's the simplest thing." A prolific artist, Beatty has designed over 75 album covers; after he decided to pursue creating art for other bands instead of just his own, his album artwork rose in popularity with his covers for Challenger by Burning Star Core in 2008 and Tame Impala's Currents in 2015.

In addition to album art, Beatty's illustration and design work has grown to include concert flyers, magazines, book covers, fashion design, music videos, and news feature illustrations, with clients including Wired and the New York Times. He has also released an artists' book, Floodgate Companion (2016), which Beatty "structured... more like an experimental film than a book." Beatty also designed the artwork for the soundtrack to the video game Thumper. His video work has been featured at the Anthology Film Archives. In 2019, Beatty created a lyric video for Cage the Elephant's song "House of Glass", from the album Social Cues.

In 2018 he contributed "surreal" art for use in fashion house Dries Van Noten's fall-winter 2018 collection, with his work featured prominently in window displays at European retail locations.

Beatty designed the cover art for historian and photographer Roger Steffens's anthology photobook The Family Acid: California (2019). His work Place Holder appeared at 21c Museum Hotel Lexington in 2019–20, and his concert posters were featured in the 2020 exhibit Cricket Press, John Lackey, and Robert Beatty: Gig Posters and Music Ephemera at the Living Arts and Science Center in Lexington.

His influences include Cal Schenkel, Kenneth Anger, Piotr Kamler, Gary Panter, Terry Gilliam, and Lillian Schwartz. Beatty also credits the film Fantastic Planet (1973).

Music
Beatty performs electronic and noise music solo under his own name and formerly performed under the names Three Legged Race and Ed Sunspot, co-founded Hair Police in 2001 (who went on to open for a Sonic Youth tour), and is or has been a member of experimental and electronic bands Warmer Milks, Burning Star Core, Eyes and Arms of Smoke, and Lexington collective Resonant Hole. He was also a member of Ulysses alongside Apples in Stereo members Robert Schneider and John Ferguson. He records and produces music on old iPhones, stating he works with a "scavenger mentality" and "[doesn't] like to buy new things to make art or music with – I like to wait for things to come to me or to find things at thrift stores".

In 2014 he released the album Soundtracks for Takeshi Murata under his own name.

Beatty also masters music, including Public Housing's 2014 self-titled album.

Discography

 Three Legged Race – Persuasive Barrier (2012)
 Robert Beatty – Soundtracks for Takeshi Murata (2014)

Album art

Bibliography

References

External links
 

1981 births
American video artists
Musicians from Kentucky
American graphic designers
American poster artists
Album-cover and concert-poster artists
American illustrators
Visual music artists
21st-century American male artists
21st-century American male musicians
Musicians from Lexington, Kentucky
Artists from Lexington, Kentucky
Living people